Azmi Mahmud (born 6 May 1967 in Parit Buntar, Perak) is a Malaysian footballer. He played as a goalkeeper for Kedah football team and the Malaysia National Team in the early 1990s.

Biography
Azmi was born on 6 May 1967 at Parit Buntar, Perak. He was not raised at Kedah, but he transferred to a local school in Kedah when he is 16 years old. He studied in Sultan Abdul Hamid College (SAHC). When he was studying in SAHC, he was selected to represent Team Kedah Schools in the Rahman Cup Competition during the event held by Schools Sports Council of Malaysia (MSSM). When he was about 17 years old, Azmi from the beginning playing as the goalkeeper, was selected to represent Malaysia as Malaysia Students Football Team in the Asian Schools Football Tournament held in Jakarta, Indonesia. Malaysia Students Football Team finished third in the competition.

Club career
Upon completing his studies, Azmi started to play to the team in the Presidents Cup competition in 1986 to become the focus of sports fans 1988. Beliau home after Kedah team managed to beat the Singapore team in the Malaysia Cup final on 15 December 1990.In 1990,Azmi received the Medal of Divine Justice bestowed by the Sultan of Kedah.

International career
At the age of 20, Azmi was selected to represent Malaysia to compete in FIFA world cup qualifier.

References

1967 births
Living people
Malaysian footballers
Malaysia international footballers
People from Perak
Kedah Darul Aman F.C. players
Footballers at the 1990 Asian Games
Malaysian people of Malay descent
Association football goalkeepers
Asian Games competitors for Malaysia